Déjà Dead is the first novel by Kathy Reichs starring forensic anthropologist  Temperance Brennan.

It won the 1998 Arthur Ellis Award for Best First Novel.

Plot
When the meticulously dismembered body of a woman is discovered in the ground of an abandoned monastery in Montreal, Canada, which is too "decomposed for standard autopsy", an anthropologist is requested.

Dr. Temperance Brennan, Director of Forensic Anthropology for the province of Quebec, who has been researching recent disappearances in the city, is given the case. Despite the deep cynicism of Detective Claudel who heads the investigation, Brennan is convinced that a serial killer is at work. Her forensic expertise finally convinces Claudel, but only after the body count has risen. Brennan initiates an investigation, but her determined probing places those closest to her in danger.

Critical reception
Reichs' work was compared to the Kay Scarpetta novels by Patricia Cornwell.

References

External links
Kathy Reichs' page on Déjà Dead

1997 American novels
Novels by Kathy Reichs
Novels set in Quebec
American crime novels
Charles Scribner's Sons books
Heinemann (publisher) books
1997 debut novels